Nana Rosenørn Holland Bastrup  (*25 February 1987 in Copenhagen) is a Danish artist. She lives and works in Copenhagen. She is a member of the artist duo Enfants Terribles and founder of Popdada

Education 
She studied in 2010-2015 at University of Fine Arts of Hamburg among others by prof. Pia Stadtbäumer and in 2013 at Akademie der bildenden Künste Wien by prof. Florian Reither.

Work grants
In 2014-2015 she became work grants at Künstlerhaus Meinersen with a scholarship of the Foundation Bösenberg (1 year), in 2016 at Künstlerhaus im Schlossgarten in Cuxhaven (6 months).

Exhibitions
She has participated in happenings and exhibitions among others at Außenplateau der Hamburger Kunsthalle, Altonaer Museum, Museet på Koldinghus, Kunsthal Aarhus and in group shows with among others Vilmantas Marcinkevičius, Peter Ravn, Matvey Slavin, Enfants Terribles, Markus Vater. In 2020 she was exhibited in the Changwon Sculpture Biennale in South Korea.

Publications 
2012: Enfants Terribles Text: Till Bräuning. Publisher: Bräuning Contemporary, Hamburg, Germany .

2014: Enfants Terribles - Kinder der Louise B. Text: Friedrich Holtiegel, Joachim Voß. Publisher: Kunstverein Barsinghausen, Germany .

2015: Footwork Text: Kerstin Hengevoss-Dürkop, John Czaplicka, Matthias Schatz. Publisher: Galerie Hengevoss-Dürkop, Hamburg, Germany .

2017: Aus der Natur - Nana ET Matvey + Maike Gräf Text: Friedrich Holtiegel. Publisher: Kunstverein Barsinghausen, Germany .

2019: Nana R H Bastrup: Polykrome Forklædninger Text: Trine Ross. Publisher: Galleri NB, Viborg, Denmark  .

2019: Nana R H Bastrup - 99 Rememberings Text: Tom Jørgensen Publisher: kunstmix, Copenhagen, Denmark .

References

External links
 Official website with comprehensive image database, biography, literature list and timeline
Nana Rosenørn Holland Bastrup on instagram

1987 births
Artists from Copenhagen
Contemporary painters
Living people
21st-century Danish painters
University of Fine Arts of Hamburg alumni